The cinnamon tanager (Schistochlamys ruficapillus) is a species of bird in the family Thraupidae.
It is found in Argentina, Brazil, and Paraguay.
Its natural habitats are subtropical or tropical dry forests, dry savanna, subtropical or tropical dry shrubland, and heavily degraded former forest.

References

External links
 Xeno-canto: audio recordings of the cinnamon tanager

cinnamon tanager
Birds of Brazil
cinnamon tanager
Taxa named by Louis Jean Pierre Vieillot
Taxonomy articles created by Polbot